Eneida (Ukrainian for "Aeneid") is a Ukrainian burlesque poem, written by Ivan Kotliarevsky in 1798. This mock-heroic poem  is considered to be the first literary work published wholly in the modern Ukrainian language. Although Ukrainian was an everyday language to millions of people in Ukraine, it was officially discouraged from literary use in the area controlled by Imperial Russia. 

Eneida is a parody of Virgil's Aeneid, where Kotliarevsky transformed the Trojan heroes into Zaporozhian Cossacks. Critics believe that it was written in the light of the destruction of Zaporozhian Host by the order of Catherine the Great. The poem was written during the formation of romanticism and nationalism in Europe. At that time, part of the Ukrainian elite was gripped by nostalgia for the Cossack state, which was liquidated by Russia in 1775–1786.

The first three parts of the poem were published in 1798 in St. Petersburg, without the author's knowledge. The complete Eneida was published after Kotliarevsky's death in 1842.

The poem is in top-100 list by "From Skovoroda to modern time: 100 most important creative art in Ukrainian".

Synopsis

І 
After the destruction of Troy by the Greeks, Aeneas (Enei) fled with a troop of Trojans by sea. Juno, who did not love Aeneas, the son of Venus, ran to the wind god Aeolus to raise a storm and drown the Trojans. Aeolus let loose the winds and made a terrible storm. But Aeneas gave a bribe to the god of the sea, Neptune, and the storm subsided. Venus, worried about her son, went to complain about Juno to Zeus. 

He said that the fate of Aeneas had already been decided — he would go to Rome to "build a strong kingdom", "drive the whole world into serfdom" and "they will all be leaders". After long wanderings, the Trojans reached Carthage, where Dido ruled. The queen fell in love with Aeneas and walked with him so that he forgot about his main goal — the construction of Rome. Zeus, accidentally looking at the earth from Olympus, saw this, got angry and sent Mercury to remind Aeneas of his appointment. Aeneas and the Trojans fled Carthage at night, and Dido burned herself with grief.

ІІ 
The Trojans sailed the sea and landed in Sicily, where King Acest ruled. The Sicilians received them hospitably. Aeneas decided to hold a wake (ceremony) for his father Anchises. During the Trojan feast and games, Juno sent her maid to earth, who persuaded the Trojan women to burn the boats. There was a big fire. Aeneas became angry and went to curse the gods, asking for rain. The rain went down and some of the ships survived. Aeneas went to bed in grief and saw his father in a dream. Anchises promised that all would be well and asked to visit him in hell.

III 
Leaving Sicily, the Trojans sailed on the sea for a long time, until they landed at Cumae. Aeneas went looking for a way to hell and met Sibyl the soothsayer. She promised to take Aeneas to hell in exchange for a bribe to the sun god Phoebus and a gift for herself. They both went down the street to hell, where Drowsiness, Yawning, and Death lived, and behind them stood the plague, war, cold, famine, and other calamities. Across the Styx, the mythical ferryman Charon transported Aeneas and Sibyl to hell. At the entrance they were met by a terrible Cerberus, to whom the soothsayer threw bread. There they saw sinners tormented in hell: lords, liars, stingy, stupid parents… Aeneas met in hell Dido and the slain fellow Trojans. Finally he met his father Anchises, who said that Aeneas will found «a great and zealous family,» that «will rule the whole world.»

IV 
After boarding the boats, the Trojans, led by Aeneas, sail on. The guide sailor sees an island ruled by the cruel queen Circe, who turns people into animals. The island could not be bypassed. Aeneas turns to Aeolus and asks to avert trouble. Aeolus helps and the army continues its journey.

Aeneas and his Trojans sail to the island ruled by the Latin king. Together with his wife Amata, he is going to marry his daughter Lavinia to King Turn. Meanwhile, Aeneas sends soldiers on reconnaissance. They tell him that the locals speak Latin. Aeneas and his army learn Latin in a week. Then Aeneas sends the king inns and he receives the Cossacks with honors, wishing that Aeneas became his son-in-law. Meanwhile, Juno, seeing that Aeneas is already allowing himself too much, decides to give him a good lesson for his impudent behavior. 

The goddess sends Erinys Telphousia, who inhabits first Amata and then visit Turnus. Turnus sees a dream in which his future bride chooses Aeneas as her fiancé. Offended, he sends a letter to the Latin king, declaring war. Aeneas' army accidentally drops greyhounds on Amata's nanny's dog. In turn, she begins to turn people against Aeneas. The Latin people are preparing for war.

V 
Aeneas is thinking about how to defeat Turnus, because the Olympic gods were in no hurry to help. Aeneas fell asleep, and in a dream an old man advises Aeneas to make friends with the Arcadians, who were enemies of the Latins. Thus he decides to seek help from the Arcadians (Evander is the king of the Arcadians, Pallant is his son). 

Aeneas sacrifices to the gods and goes to Evander. He agrees to help and sends his son Pallant with the army. Venus asks Vulcan the blacksmith to make her son Aeneas a strong weapon.

Juno sends a maid to warn Turnus about a possible attack by Aeneas and advises to strike first. He besieges the Trojan fortress, but can not take it. Then he burns the Trojan fleet. Venus complains to Cybella (mother of the gods), and she, in turn, complains to Zeus. The supreme god turns the ships of the Trojans into sirens, and the Rutuls flee in fear. Then there was silence again. Nyz and Evrial, young warriors, are on guard. Nyz offers to get into the Rutul camp and beat the enemies. He wants to do it himself, because Evrial has an old mother, and he has no one. However, his comrade does not agree, and they go together. Nyz and Evrial showed great courage, cut out many enemies, and when they returned, they came across Latins going to their camp. The young men try to hide in the woods, but the Latins tracked them down, surrounded the forest, from which "you can not slip away", and began to look for a "brave couple". When Evrial was caught, Nyz climbed a willow tree, dropped his spear, and thus revealed himself. Colonel Wolsent executed Evrial, and Nyz thrust his sword into the enemy and fell in battle.

A fierce battle begins. Turnus goes with the army to the assault fortress, and the Trojans bravely defend themselves; Juno intervenes again and defends Turnus. The Rutuls are beating the Trojans and they already want to leave the fortress. Then the artillery chief begins to embarrass them, to remind them that Aeneas "considers us soldiers, the grandchildren of the most glorious grandfathers". The embarrassed Trojans rallied and went on the offensive, and Turnus fled.

VI 
Angered at the gods for their intervention, Zeus forbids the gods to do anything for either party. Venus comes to the supreme god, begins to flatter him and complain about Juno. Juno, hearing this, starts a quarrel.

At this time, Aeneas sails on a ship with Pallant to help the Trojans. When everyone is asleep, he thinks about how to defeat Turnus. Suddenly he sees a mavka in the water. She tells him that Turnus and his soldiers have already started fighting the Trojans and nearly burned their fleet. Aeneas rushes to the rescue and immediately rushes into battle. Turnus kills the brave Pallant. Jul told Aeneas what had happened in his absence.

Zeus, drunk, went to apologize to his wife Juno. She deceived God with her cunning and put him to sleep. Juno turned into the image of Aeneas and lured Turnus to the ship so that he would sail home and not die.

The next day, Aeneas buried the dead. Envoys from Latin came to him. He tells them that he is not fighting against the Latins, but against Turnus, and offers to arrange a one-on-one duel with him. The ambassadors liked it and they retold the words of Aeneas to Latin and Turnus. The latter reluctantly prepares for a duel. Amata opposes the marriage of her daughter and Turnus, because she is secretly in love with him.

The next day, both sides took up positions to watch the battle. Juno sends Juturna to help Turnus. She starts a fight between the Trojans and the Rutuls again. Aeneas was wounded during the skirmish. Venus collects for him all sorts of potions that help heal the wound.

Thinking that Turn is dead, Amata decides to hang himself. This news frightened everyone. Aeneas goes to a duel with Turn, knocks him out of the sword. Juno, with the hand of Juturna, gives Turnus another sword. For this, Zeus quarrels with Juno and says: "We have already told all the gods: Aeneas will be with us in Olympus to eat the same pies that I tell you to bake." The duel continues. Having knocked Turnus to the ground, Aeneas is going to kill him, but Rutul's words touched his heart. Suddenly he notices Pallant's armor on Turnus' body and kills him.

English translation 
Partial translations of Eneida date back to 1933 when a translation of first few stanzas of Kotliarevsky's Eneida by Wolodymyr Semenyna was published in the American newspaper of Ukrainian diaspora Ukrainian Weekly on October 20, 1933. Another partial translation was published by University of Toronto Press in 1963 in the anthology Ukrainian Poets 1189–1962, by C. H. Andrusyshen and Watson Kirkconnell. However, the first full English translation of Kotliarevsky's magnum opus Eneida was published only in 2006 in Canada by a Ukrainian-Canadian Bohdan Melnyk, most well known for his English translation of Ivan Franko's Ukrainian fairy tale "Mykyta the Fox" (Ukrainian: Лис Микита).

List of English translations 
 Ivan Kotliarevsky. Aeneid: [Translated into English from Ukrainian by Bohdan Melnyk]. — Canada, Toronto: The Basilian Press, 2004. — 278 pages. .

Adaptations 
 Eneida, a 1991 Ukrainian animation film directed by Volodymyr Dakhno.

References 

History of Ukrainian literature
Ukrainian poems
Works based on the Aeneid
Poetry based on works by Virgil